Women in Games WIGJ is a UK-based community interest company which aims to recruit more women into the video gaming industry and to protect the interests of women in the industry. It was founded in 2009 and originally known as Women in Games Jobs (WIGJ); the initials are still part of its legal name. The company's CEO is Marie Claire Isaaman.

The company began a mentoring program in 2015 to support women joining the games industry. In 2018 it was announced that Facebook would be partnering with Women in Games WIGJ in its Women in Gaming Initiative, "dedicated to encouraging more women to join the games industry".

Women in Games WIGJ run an annual conference - Women in Games European Conference - in addition to an annual awards ceremony. There was controversy when in 2018 WIGJ awarded its "Best presenter" esports award to a man, James Banks.

See also
 Women and video games

References

External links
 

2009 establishments in the United Kingdom
Women in the video game industry
Video game organizations